LMS diesel shunter No. 1831 was an experimental diesel hydraulic shunter built by the London, Midland and Scottish Railway (LMS) in 1931/3, which pioneered diesel shunting in the UK.

Design
It was ordered in 1931 from the Midland Railway's Derby Works and delivered in December 1932, nominally a rebuild of a Midland Railway 1377 Class 0-6-0T steam locomotive of the same number, built in September 1892 by the Vulcan Foundry. The frames and running gear of the original locomotive were retained. It had a Davey Paxman 6-cylinder  at 750 rpm engine (later converted to 
and a Haslam & Newton transmission.

History
After initial testing, the locomotive entered stock in May 1934, but was not successful in ordinary service. The locomotive was put into storage in 1936 and officially withdrawn from service in September 1939. It was converted to a mobile power unit, emerging in its new guise as MPU3 in November 1940. It was scrapped in August 1951.

References

Diesel 1831
C locomotives
Railway locomotives introduced in 1931
Scrapped locomotives
Standard gauge locomotives of Great Britain